The Laurel Creek Gorge Bridge is a continuous steel plate girder bridge that spans Laurel Creek on Interstate 26/U.S. Route 19/U.S. Route 23 between Asheville, North Carolina and Johnson City, Tennessee. Construction of the bridge was finished in 2002. Due to its proximity to the higher mountains and its elevation of over 3000', the highway in this area is subject to heavy snow and icing. The bridge design incorporates a special system which sprays de-icing liquid onto the bridge deck whenever icing is detected.

The section of I-26 from U.S. Route 19 to the border with Tennessee was designated a scenic highway by the North Carolina Board of Transportation.

See also 
 
 
 
 List of bridges in the United States by height

References 

Bridges completed in 2002
Road bridges in North Carolina
2002 establishments in the United States
Interstate 26
U.S. Route 19
U.S. Route 23
Bridges on the Interstate Highway System
Bridges of the United States Numbered Highway System
Steel bridges in the United States
Plate girder bridges in the United States